Fletcher's Fields is a rugby stadium in Markham, Ontario, Canada. There are six rugby fields, but only one with a grandstand for spectators. The club house, with changerooms and a snack bar, is located in the centre of the facility. Parking is located in two lots south of 19th Avenue and one north of the clubhouse.

The field was named for Denis Fletcher, a proponent of rugby in Ontario during the 1950s and 1960s.

It previously served as home to the Toronto Rebellion of the Rugby Canada Super League.  The stadium, which seats 3,200 people, has hosted numerous Canada national rugby union team matches in the past was one of the venues for the 2008 Churchill Cup. It also hosted the 2011 Colonial Cup.

Rugby League
In 2011 this venue hosted all Canadian National Rugby League team matches which included:
Canada vs Jamaica
Canada vs USA
Canada vs South Africa

Due to pitch work at Lamport Stadium, Toronto Wolfpack played their home Betfred Championship match against Swinton Lions at Fletcher's Field on May 5, 2018.

See also

List of rugby league stadiums by capacity

References

External links

Sports venues in Ontario
Rugby union stadiums in Ontario
Sport in Markham, Ontario
Rugby league stadiums in Canada
Toronto Wolfpack
1980 establishments in Ontario
Sports venues completed in 1980